The World Combat Games is an international multi-sport event featuring combat sports and martial arts. The games were founded by SportAccord (now known as the Global Association of International Sports Federations) as a way of bringing various martial arts and combative sports to an international audience. The World Combat Games are also accompanied by a cultural program that reflects the ancient traditions and values of martial arts as well as their contribution to modern society. The games are recognised by the International Olympic Committee.

Games

History

World Combat Games 2010
The first World Combat Games was held 2010 in Beijing, with competitions for boxing, judo, ju-jitsu, karate, kendo, kickboxing, sanshou, Muay Thai, sambo, sumo, taekwondo, wrestling, wushu, and an aikido demonstration. Over 1000 athletes from all five continents participated. About the same number of volunteers helped to deliver the event. During the eight days of competitions 118 gold medals were awarded. Medals were won by 60% of the nations taking part in the Games, and also by not traditional combat sports nations. Russia lead the medal table with 18 gold medals, followed by China (15) and the Ukraine (7).

World Combat Games 2013
The second World Combat Games were held in Saint Petersburg. In these Games, the sports of savate and fencing made their debut. Russia dominated the medal table, with 47 gold medals.

World Combat Games 2019
The demise of the SportAccord organisation, following a dispute with the International Olympic Committee and the SportAccord president Marius Vizer led to a temporary halt on the World Combat Games. The successor organisation, Global Association of International Sports Federations or GAISF took over the organisation of the event, and signed heads of agreement in November 2017 with official from Chinese Taipei for a 2019 edition of the event. However, it proved impossible to organise within the time frame, and the 2019 was shelved, with the intention of relaunching the event in 2021.

World Combat Games 2021
On May 10, 2019, GAISF announced that Nur-Sultan, Kazakhstan's capital city, had been awarded the 2021 World Combat Games. The Games will take place from May 3 to 9 in the capital city, which had recently been renamed from Astana. At the announcement, GAISF announced that event would henceforth adhere to a quadrennial timescale, with the next event, as yet unawarded, planned for 2025.

Competitions

Medal table

See also
 SportAccord
 SportAccord World Mind Games

References

External links
 Official website
 SportAccord
 World Combat Games schedule and results

 
Multi-sport events
Combat sports
Recurring sporting events established in 2010
Martial arts competitions